Porcia is a comune (municipality) in the Province of Pordenone in the Italian region Friuli-Venezia Giulia, located about  northwest of Trieste and about  west of Pordenone.

Main sights
The castle, residence from the 12th century of the Porcia family (Counts, later Princes) .
Torre dell'Orologio (Watch Tower)
Villa Correr-Dolfin (late 17th-early 18th centuries)
Church of St. George, known from 1262. It has a  standing unfinished bell tower.

Twin towns
 Spittal an der Drau, Austria
 Berettyóújfalu, Hungary

References

External links
 Official website

Cities and towns in Friuli-Venezia Giulia